Urban Shopping Plaza is a shopping mall located in Yilan City, Yilan County, Taiwan that opened on 13 July 2022. The plaza has introduced both domestic and international catering and lifestyle brands, including Sushiro, Nitori, Daiso, Starbucks, Kangol, and various themed restaurants.

Public Transportation
The mall is located in close proximity to Yilan railway station, which is served by the Taiwan Railways.

See also
 List of tourist attractions in Taiwan
 Luna Plaza

References

External links

2022 establishments in Taiwan
Shopping malls in Yilan City
Shopping malls established in 2022